Nuq (also Romanized as Nūq; also known as Nūk Neyz, Nūgh, and Nūk) is a village in Roshtkhar Rural District, in the Central District of Roshtkhar County, Razavi Khorasan Province, Iran. At the 2006 census, its population was 1,737, in 376 families.

References 

Populated places in Roshtkhar County